Franklin Roy Bruno,  (born 16 November 1961) is a British former professional boxer who competed from 1982 to 1996. He had a highly publicised and eventful career, both in and out of the ring. The pinnacle of Bruno's boxing career was winning the WBC heavyweight title from Oliver McCall at a packed Wembley Stadium in 1995, in what was his fourth world championship challenge. Bruno faced multiple top-rated heavyweights throughout his career, including two defeats against Mike Tyson in 1989 and 1996, and a defeat against fellow Briton Lennox Lewis in 1993.

He was also known for his exceptional punching power, scoring 38 knockouts in 40 wins and giving him a 95% knockout-to-win ratio; his overall knockout percentage was 84.44%. Bruno has been ranked among BoxRec's 10 best heavyweights in the world 12 times, reaching his career-high ranking of world No.3 at the conclusion of 1984. Like Henry Cooper before him, Bruno has remained a popular celebrity with the British public following his retirement from boxing, including his well-documented struggles with mental health.

Professional career 
Bruno became a professional boxer in 1981, quickly achieving 21 consecutive wins by knockout. This streak caught the attention of international boxing magazines, such as The Ring, KO Magazine, Boxing Illustrated and Ring En Español. During this period Bruno defeated former world title contender Scott LeDoux, the fringe contender Floyd Cummings who had was controversially stopped from gaining his own stoppage victory when the referee unfairly protected Bruno, Belgian champion Rudy Gauwe, British contenders Tony Moore and Eddie Nielson, and opponents such as Bill Sharkey, Walter Santemore and Ken Lakusta. However, in May 1984 the up-and-coming future world heavyweight champion, American James "Bonecrusher" Smith, halted that streak when he defeated Bruno by knockout in the tenth and final round of their bout, with Bruno leading clearly on all three judges' cards.

European heavyweight champion and WBA title challenge
Bruno won his next six bouts against respected opposition. He won the European heavyweight title with a KO over Sweden's Anders Eklund, KO'd former European champion and world title contender Lucien Rodriguez in one round, was taken the distance for the first time by the useful world rated Phil Brown, and beat fringe fighters Larry Frazier and Jeff Jordan.

Bruno got back into title contention with an impressive one-round KO win over former WBA champion Gerrie Coetzee of South Africa, and, in July 1986, he challenged Tim Witherspoon for the WBA heavyweight title. After once again leading on the cards for most of the fight, he ran out of steam and was defeated by knockout in round eleven.

Bruno once again got himself back into title contention with wins over former contender James Tillis and journeymen Reggie Gross and Chuck Gardner. In October 1987 Bruno faced the veteran Joe Bugner in an all British match up. Bugner although long past his peak, was coming off impressive wins over Greg Page, James Tillis and David Bey. Bruno won by TKO in the 8th round, the referee stopping the bout, although it appeared the protesting Bugner could have continued.

Bruno vs. Tyson
In February 1989, Bruno challenged Mike Tyson for the undisputed world heavyweight title. In the opening moments, the fighters came together with huge punches. Bruno's legs buckled, and he took a big step back, inadvertently stepping off the ring apron. Most agree that he would have gone down, at least to a knee in any event, and this was called a knockdown. Bruno did not complain, and instead gathered himself to continue, ultimately rocking Tyson (for the first time in Tyson's career) with a left hook toward the end of the round. However, Tyson recovered and eventually beat Bruno when the referee stopped the contest in round five with Bruno taking heavy punishment, lying helpless on the ropes.

Bruno kept winning fights, helping him to retain his spot as one of the world's leading heavyweights. He defeated contender Carl Williams, and then journeymen such as Jose Ribalta, Pierre Coetzer, and Dutchman Jan Emmen.

Bruno vs. Lewis
In 1993 he had a third world title chance against  Lennox Lewis, who was making the second defence of the belt (his first of three championship reigns). The Lennox Lewis vs. Frank Bruno fight was the first time that two British boxers had fought for the world heavyweight title. Lewis beat Bruno on a stoppage in round seven, Bruno again failing to take his title chance after leading the contest on points up until what proved the final round.

Bruno again regrouped, dispatching trialhorse Jesse Ferguson in one round, and the fringe contenders Rodolfo Marin and Mike Evans equally easily.

WBC heavyweight champion and retirement
On 2 September 1995, Bruno finally became world champion by outpointing WBC Champion Oliver McCall over twelve rounds.  After an even start, Bruno built up a strong lead in the middle rounds, and seemed to run somewhat out of steam in the last couple: however, unlike Bonecrusher Smith and Tim Witherspoon earlier in Bruno's career, McCall was unable to find a way through Bruno's defences to force the late stoppage he needed, and a tired Bruno hung on to win unanimously on points, only the second time he had taken an opponent to the judges. Bruno did not last long as champion – the contract he signed to get McCall meant he had to face Mike Tyson in his first defence. Tyson beat Bruno on a stoppage in round three, Bruno performed unusually poorly in what turned out to be his last bout as a professional due to a severe eye injury caused by Tyson. Bruno was advised not to fight again to avoid running the risk of causing any more damage to it, which could result in permanent blindness. Bruno retired soon after the fight.

Bruno's publicist throughout most of his career was sports historian Norman Giller, who wrote three books with Bruno: Know What I Mean, Eye of the Tiger and From Zero to Hero. His manager for all but his last five fights was Terry Lawless, who signed him as a professional shortly after he had become ABA heavyweight champion at the age of eighteen.

Personal life
On 22 September 2003, Bruno was taken from his home near Brentwood in Essex by medical staff assisted by police officers, under the provisions of the Mental Health Act 1983. He was taken to Goodmayes Hospital in Ilford, where he underwent psychological and psychiatric tests. He had been suffering from depression for several months beforehand. He was later diagnosed as having bipolar disorder. On 9 October 2005, Bruno admitted that cocaine use, which began in 2000, had contributed to his mental health problems. Media coverage of Bruno's problems raised controversy, the principal accusations being gross intrusion and insensitivity. Particular criticism was aimed at The Sun, whose headline in the first editions the next day read "Bonkers Bruno Locked Up". Second editions retracted the headline and attempted to portray a more sympathetic attitude towards Bruno and mental health in general. As an attempt at atonement, the paper established a charity fund for people suffering from mental illness, although some mental health charities condemned The Sun latter action that day as being grossly cynical in the light of the former. On 24 February 2008, Bruno offered his support to former footballer Paul Gascoigne, who on 21 February had been sectioned under the Mental Health Act. Bruno also spoke on his own personal experiences in the mental health system at a conference run by Hari Sewell, on 22 June 2009. Bruno was sectioned again in 2012 and taken to St Andrew's Hospital in Northampton for five weeks. In December 2013, Bruno spoke to the Daily Mirror in support of their mental health campaign, stating: "Mental illness is a terrible thing to have to cope with but I’ve learnt it’s a fight you can win if you live your life the right way".

In December 2005, Bruno announced that he was to become a father for the fourth time since finding new romance with old friend Yvonne Clydesdale. The couple, who first met five years previously at a health resort, began dating months after bumping into each other at a wine bar near his home. Yvonne gave birth to baby Freya on 10 May 2006. On 10 October 2006, Bruno and Clydesdale were jointly awarded £50,000 damages for libel against The People newspaper and publishers MGN in respect of false claims made about their relationship. In 2006, Bruno published an autobiography Frank: Fighting Back. It won the Best Autobiography category of the British Sports Book Awards. As of May 2012, Bruno was living in Glasgow with his new hairdresser girlfriend, Nina Coletta in the Gorbals area of the city.

Bruno has joined the Get Close and Personal Platform to raise funds to support The Frank Bruno Foundation, dedicated to improving the mental health of men around the world. Bruno offers one-to-one video calls with anybody wanting to discuss issues related to mental health and Bruno's own journey.

Media appearances and non-boxing interests
Bruno's image was enhanced by his relationship with the BBC boxing commentator Harry Carpenter, which, in their many interviews, was generated Bruno's best-known and most-quoted phrases "Know what I mean, Harry?", his appearances on Comic Relief programmes in the early-1980s and his frequent appearances thereafter on television and on stage (in pantomime).

In 1991, he opened "The Ultimate" at Lightwater Valley which was, at the time, the longest roller coaster in the world. He described the ride "scarier than Mike Tyson". In 1993, Bruno briefly appeared as a guest on CITV's Finders Keepers hosted by Neil Buchanan. The episode aired on Tuesday 30 March that year. He was the subject of a This is Your Life programme in 1993, when he was surprised by Michael Aspel.  In 1995, the year of his world championship, he released a cover version of "Eye of the Tiger", the theme song of the movie Rocky III. It reached No. 28 in the UK charts. In 1999, he featured on the celebrity special in the second season of Fort Boyard.

In January 2001, prior to that year's general election, Bruno announced that he wanted to stand as the Conservative candidate in the traditionally safe Conservative seat of Brentwood and Ongar against the independent Member of Parliament, Martin Bell. His proposed slogan was "Don't be a plank, vote for Frank!" However, this idea was quickly dismissed by Conservative Central Office. In an interview with BBC Sport at the time, Bruno laughed at the story and denied he had any intention of standing. In 2006, he was one of a number of celebrities who were recorded on the World Cup song, "Who Do You Think You Are Kidding Jurgen Klinsmann?". On 15 August 2009, he appeared on The Weakest Link beating Duke McKenzie in the final for £12,800. He had a small role in the 2008 British crime drama Cass. Bruno made brief guest appearances in episodes of the ITV comedy show, Harry Hill's TV Burp in February and October 2011. On 21 April 2011, Bruno appeared on the ITV1 chat show The Alan Titchmarsh Show, where he was candid about his previous health issues. In 2011, he made a guest appearance in Sooty. On 20 April 2012, Bruno was featured in the ITV series Piers Morgan's Life Stories.

He supports West Ham United F.C. whilst also having an affinity for the Scottish team, Aberdeen F.C. Bruno completed the 2011 London Marathon which is the third marathon he has run successfully. He has also run numerous half marathons. He is also a patron for The Shannon Bradshaw Trust, a children's charity.
Bruno regularly makes personal appearances and also sells autographed items of memorabilia. On 23 July 2013, Bruno was featured in the BBC Three documentary with his daughter Rachel in Rachel Bruno: My Dad and Me.

In 2020 amid the COVID-19 crisis, Frank Bruno joined a supergroup of celebrities called The Celebs which included Kellie Shirley and X Factor winner Sam Bailey to raise money for both Alzheimer's Society and Action for Children. They recorded a new rendition of "Merry Christmas Everyone" by Shakin' Stevens and it was released digitally on 11 December 2020, on independent record label Saga Entertainment. The music video debuted exclusively on Good Morning Britain the day before release. The song peaked at number two on the iTunes pop chart.

Professional boxing record

References

External links
 Frank Bruno legend and loved by the British public,  always well remembered and people's champion 

Profile: Frank Bruno at BBC News
How Bruno's troubles began at BBC Sport

1961 births
Living people
BBC Sports Personality Lifetime Achievement Award recipients
Black British sportsmen
Boxers from Greater London
England Boxing champions
English people of Dominica descent
English people of Jamaican descent
European Boxing Union champions
Members of the Order of the British Empire
People from Hammersmith
People with bipolar disorder
World Boxing Council champions
World heavyweight boxing champions